Otra realidad is a studio album by Spanish singer Beth, released  April 23, 2003.

Tracks
 Parando el tiempo
 La luz (It's Summer In My Heart)
 Estás
 Vestida de besos
 Quiéreme otra vez
 Otra realidad
 Hoy
  (Light Years Apart)
 Llévame contigo
 Eclipse
 Vuelvo por ti
 Diario de dos
 Un mundo perfecto
 Dime - (bonus track)

References

2003 albums
Beth (singer) albums